Amanda Thornton Congdon (born August 4, 1981, in New York City) is an American former video blogger.  She began her on-screen career as the first anchor of the online daily news show, Rocketboom, which she hosted and produced until June 23, 2006.

Involvement with Rocketboom
Congdon began as Rocketboom's anchor with the show's October 26, 2004, debut.

The show went from an initial 700 viewers in 2004 to 70,000 viewers in the first ten months. BusinessWeek labeled it "the most popular site of its kind on the Net". More viewers visited Rocketboom after an June 11, 2006, interview with Congdon on CNN.
Rocketboom's audience continued to increase, going from 100,000 vlog viewers at the end of 2005 to 300,000 by the spring of 2006.

On July 5, 2006, Congdon released a video statement on her blog, announcing her departure from the show.  Andrew Baron, majority stakeholder of Rocketboom, stated she was leaving the show to "pursue opportunities ... in Hollywood" and Joanne Colan stepped in as Congdon's replacement. Congdon claims that she was fired.

Amanda Across America
Congdon's first endeavor after Rocketboom was AmandaAcrossAmerica.com, a blog based on Congdon's travels through America in a hybrid vehicle. The journey took a circuitous route with stops in New York, Connecticut, New Jersey, Pennsylvania, North Carolina, Tennessee, Washington, D.C., Missouri, Wisconsin, Arizona and California.

Now living in California, Congdon and her husband, Mario Librandi, opened a restaurant called Vegan Mario's. The restaurant serves vegan food for lunch daily, upon which Congdon initially planned to create a website series.

References

External links

1981 births
Living people
American women bloggers
American bloggers
American women comedians
Actresses from New York City
Northwestern University alumni
American reporters and correspondents
Video bloggers
Women video bloggers
Participants in American reality television series
Journalists from New York City
Comedians from New York City
American women non-fiction writers
21st-century American non-fiction writers
21st-century American comedians
21st-century American women writers